The Kuznetsov NK-32 is an afterburning three-spool low bypass turbofan jet engine which powers the Tupolev Tu-160 supersonic bomber, and was fitted to the later model Tupolev Tu-144LL supersonic transport. It produces  of thrust in  afterburner.

A non-afterburning variant known as NK-32 Tier 2 for Tu-160 and NK-65 will be used in the upcoming Russian bomber, PAK DA.

NK-65 and a geared high-bypass turbofan variant PD-30, with a thrust of 30 tonnes (around 300 kN)  has been proposed for use on new Russian wide-body airliners, as well as the upgraded Antonov An-124 Ruslan heavylifter.

Applications
 Tupolev Tu-160
 Tupolev Tu-144LL
 Tupolev Tu-22M3M
 Yakovlev Yak-43
 PAK DA

Specifications

See also

References

External links

 NK-32 on LeteckeMotory.cz (Czech)

Low-bypass turbofan engines
Kuznetsov aircraft engines
1980s turbofan engines
Three-spool turbofan engines